Harris v. Forklift Systems, Inc., 510 U.S. 17 (1993), is a US labor law case in which the Supreme Court of the United States clarified the definition of a "hostile" or "abusive" work environment under Title VII of the Civil Rights Act of 1964.  In a unanimous opinion written by Justice Sandra Day O'Connor, the Court held that a determination about whether a work environment is hostile or abusive requires a consideration of all relevant circumstances.

Facts

Title VII of the Civil Rights Act of 1964 states that it is "an unlawful employment practice for an employer . . . to discriminate against any individual with respect to his compensation, terms, conditions, or privileges of employment, because of such individual's race, color, religion, sex, or national origin."

Teresa Harris claimed that the President of Forklift Systems, Inc, Charles Hardy, discriminated against her and subjected her to sexual innuendo at work on multiple occasions, including in front of other employees. She was a manager at the equipment rental company, between April 1985 and October 1987. Harris first complained directly to Hardy about his behavior in August 1987, and he claimed that he was kidding and apologized to Harris. After Harris complained, Hardy said that he would stop that kind of behavior, so Harris stayed at the job. However, in September, Hardy started harassing her again in front of other employees. Harris got her paycheck and quit her job at Forklift Systems, Inc. on October 1. After quitting, Harris sued Forklift Systems, Inc. Harris claimed that Hardy's behavior made an abusive work environment for her based on her gender under Title VII of the Civil Rights Act of 1964.

Judgment

District Court of Tennessee
The United States District Court for the District of Tennessee stated that Hardy's behavior did not make a cruel work environment for Harris. The District claimed that Hardy's conduct would have made any "reasonable woman" uncomfortable but would not have affected their psychological well being and performance at work. The District Court held that the evidence presented by Harris was not sufficient to show that Hardy's behavior actually affected the conditions of her employment; therefore, there was no Title VII violation.

Sixth Circuit, Court of Appeals
The United States Court of Appeals, Sixth Circuit, affirmed the District Court's decision. It said a ‘hostile environment’ had to ‘seriously affect psychological well-being’ or mean the plaintiff ‘suffer injury’.

Supreme Court
The US Supreme Court, reversing the Courts below, held an abusive environment ‘that does not seriously affect employees’ psychological well-being can and often will detract from... job performance, discourage employees from staying on the job, or keep them from advancing in their careers.’ If the environment ‘would reasonably be perceived, and is perceived, as hostile or abusive’ this is enough. It remanded the case. This suit was later settled outside of Court, and the terms were not released.

Justice Sandra Day O'Connor said the following:

See also

US labor law
 List of United States Supreme Court cases
 Lists of United States Supreme Court cases by volume
 List of United States Supreme Court cases by the Rehnquist Court

Notes

External links
 

United States Supreme Court cases
United States Supreme Court cases of the Rehnquist Court
1993 in United States case law
United States gender discrimination case law
Sexual harassment in the United States
United States labor case law
United States employment discrimination case law
Harassment case law